This is a list of chairpersons of the Austrian People's Party.

List of officeholders

References 

Austrian People's Party politicians